Ambás may refer to:

 Ambás (Carreño), a civil parish in Spain
 Ambás (Grado), a civil parish in Spain
 Ambás (Villaviciosa), a civil parish in Spain